Birdie is a 2018 short drama film, directed by Shelly Lauman. It premiered at the 2018 Melbourne International Film Festival, followed by screenings at AFI Fest and the 2018 Toronto International Film Festival, where it was then acquired by Fox Searchlight Pictures, making it the first short film to be distributed by the studio.

Premise
A woman walks alone to the train station. As she descends the stairs to the underground platform she smiles at a young man, he smiles back. With the smallest of gestures, the woman becomes caught in a subtle and sinister game.

References

External links

Birdie at Shelly Lauman's website

2018 films
2018 drama films
2018 short films
Fox Searchlight Pictures films
Australian drama short films
2010s English-language films